The Three Rivers Fire was a wildfire that started near the towns of Mescalero and Tularosa, New Mexico on April 26, 2021. The fire burned  in the Lincoln National Forest and was fully contained on June 21, 2021.

Development

April 
The Three Rivers Fire was first reported on April 26, 2021, at around 8am MST. It started near the Three Rivers Campground in the Lincoln National Forest.

May

Containment 
On May 4, 2021, the fire was 23% contained.

On May 17, 2021, the fire was 78% contained.

On May 31, 2021, the fire was 98% contained.

Impact

Closures and Evacuations
The Three Rivers Fire forced the closure of a number of roads, campgrounds, and hiking trails within the White Mountain Wilderness of the Lincoln National Forest, including the Three Rivers Campground itself. Evacuation notices were issued to several communities in the surrounding area.

Aftermath 
In early May, after performing a BAER assessment, forest service officials closed the area of the White Mountain Wilderness around the fire's burn scar to recreation due to the increased risk of flooding and mudslides. Some of the closed area was reopened to recreation in late June, including parts of the Crest Trail and Argentina Canyon Trail. However, the Three Rivers Campground remains closed as of July 2021, along with numerous other trails around the burn scar.

See also 

 2021 New Mexico wildfires

References 

2021 New Mexico wildfires
April 2021 events in the United States